A general election was held in the U.S. state of Wyoming on Tuesday, November 2, 1982. All of the state's executive officers—the Governor, Secretary of State, Auditor, Treasurer, and Superintendent of Public Instruction—were up for election. Democratic Governor Edgar Herschler won a landslide victory on his way to a record third term in office and Democrat Lynn Simons, first elected in 1978 as Superintendent of Public Instruction, won a sizable re-election as well. Republicans held the other statewide offices.

Governor

Incumbent Democratic Governor Edgar Herschler ran for re-election to a third term. He faced former State House Speaker Warren A. Morton in the general election, and defeated him in a landslide to win a third term, the first governor of the state to do so.

Secretary of State
Incumbent Republican Secretary of State Thyra Thomson ran for re-election to a sixth term. Unopposed in the Republican primary, she faced rancher Leslie Peterson, the Democratic nominee, in the general election. Peterson ran a stronger campaign than any of Thomson's past opponents, and though Thomson ultimately won re-election, she did so by her slimmest margin.

Democratic primary

Candidates
 Leslie Peterson, Jackson rancher

Results

Republican primary

Candidates
 Thyra Thomson, incumbent Secretary of State

Results

General election

Results

Auditor
Incumbent Republican State Auditor Jim Griffith ran for re-election to a third term. He won the Republican primary unopposed and was initially set to face no opposition in the general election, as no Democratic candidate filed to oppose him. However, Sid Kornegay, a Democrat who ran for Congress in 1980, announced on the day of the primary that he would seek the Democratic Party's nomination as a write-in candidate. After Kornegay received 11 write-in votes in the Democratic primary, he was offered the nomination, which he accepted. Griffith, who was not seen as vulnerable by the Democratic Party, ended up defeating Kornegay in a landslide, winning 74% of the vote to Kornegay's 26%.

Democratic primary
No Democratic candidates filed for State Auditor. However, Kornegay, a Democratic candidate for Congress in 1980 received 11 write-in votes and was offered the nomination, which he accepted.

Republican primary

Candidates
 Jim Griffith, incumbent State Auditor

Results

General election

Results

Treasurer
Incumbent Republican State Treasurer Shirley Wittler was unable to seek re-election to a second term due to term limits. Craig L. Thomas, who unsuccessfully ran in the 1978 Republican primary, announced that he would run again, and received Wittler's endorsement. He faced former State Representative Stan Smith in the primary, and Smith narrowly defeated him—and by an even narrower margin than Wittler did four years earlier. In the general election, Smith was opposed by Carbon County Treasurer C. R. "Dick" Engstrom. Though Engstrom improved on Democrats' performance from 1978, he still lost to Smith by a sizable margin.

Democratic primary

Candidates
 C. R. "Dick" Engstrom, Carbon County Treasurer

Results

Republican primary

Candidates
 Stan Smith, former State Representative from Hot Springs
 Craig L. Thomas, general manager of the Wyoming Rural Electric Association

Results

General election

Results

Superintendent of Public Instruction
Incumbent Democratic Superintendent of Public Instruction Lynn Simons ran for re-election to a second term. She was opposed in the general election by Republican nominee Gary Elliott, a former member of the Teton County School Board. Simons ultimately defeated Elliott by a significant margin.

Democratic primary

Candidates
 Lynn Simons, incumbent Superintendent of Public Instruction

Results

Republican primary

Candidates
 Gary W. Elliott, former Teton County School Board member

Results

General election

Results

References

 
Wyoming